VA-161 has the following meanings:
Attack Squadron 161 (U.S. Navy)
State Route 161 (Virginia)